Krasninsky District is the name of several administrative and municipal districts in Russia:
Krasninsky District, Lipetsk Oblast, an administrative and municipal district of Lipetsk Oblast
Krasninsky District, Smolensk Oblast, an administrative and municipal district of Smolensk Oblast

See also
Krasninsky (disambiguation)
Krasnensky District

References